Kumaragupta II (Gupta script:  Ku-ma-ra-gu-pta) Kramaditya was an emperor of the Gupta Empire. An image of Gautama Buddha at Sarnath notes that he succeeded Purugupta who was most likely his father. He was succeeded by Budhagupta.

Several statues of the standing Buddha, representative of Gupta art, are known from the reign of Kumaragupta II, now in the Sarnath Museum.

References

Gupta Empire
5th-century Indian monarchs